Ishikawa (written:  lit. "stone river") is the 28th most common Japanese surname. Notable people with the surname include:

 Akio Ishikawa, Japanese shogi player
Arisa Ishikawa or Sumire (1987–2009), Japanese fashion model
Bun'yō Ishikawa (born 1938), Japanese photographer and photojournalist
Chiaki Ishikawa (born 1969), Japanese musician
Chu Ishikawa (born 1966), Japanese composer and musician
, Japanese footballer
Goemon Ishikawa (died 1594), Japanese outlaw hero
, Japanese rower
, Japanese alpine skier
Hideo Ishikawa (born 1969), Japanese voice actor
Hideshi Isikawa (born 1954), Japanese archaeologist
Jun Ishikawa (author) (1899–1987), Japanese author
Kaito Ishikawa (born 1993), Japones actor and voice actor
Kaoru Ishikawa (1915–1989), Japanese university professor, developer of the Ishikawa diagram
Kasumi Ishikawa (born 1993), female Japanese table tennis player
, Japanese footballer
, Japanese swimmer
Koji Ishikawa (artist) (born 1968), Japanese contemporary artist
Koji Ishikawa (illustrator) (born 1963), Japanese children's book author and illustrator
, Japanese photographer
Masamochi Ishikawa (1754–1830), Japanese scholar, poet and writer
Melody Miyuki Ishikawa (born 1982), Japanese-American pop singer and television host
Miki Ishikawa (born 1991), Japanese-American actress and singer
, Japanese midwife and serial killer
Masaji Ishikawa (born 1947), North Korean defector and author
Momoko Ishikawa, a voice actress for Sky Girls
Naohiro Ishikawa (born 1981), Japanese football player
Rika Ishikawa (born 1985), Japanese idol, former member of Morning Musume
Rokuro Ishikawa, Japanese businessman
Ryo Ishikawa (born 1991), Japanese professional golf player
Sanshirō Ishikawa (1876-1956), Japanese anarchist
Sayuri Ishikawa (born 1958), Japanese enka singer
, Japanese baseball player
Shoko Ishikawa(born 1990), Japanese figure skater
, Japanese baseball player
Tatsuya Ishikawa (born 1979), Japanese footballer
, Japanese writer
Takuboku Ishikawa, Japanese poet
Travis Ishikawa (born 1983), American professional baseball first baseman
, Japanese politician 
Yui Ishikawa (born 1989), Japanese voice actress
, Japanese male volleyball player.
, Japanese female volleyball player.

Fictional characters
Keiko Ishikawa, a character in the American science fiction television series Star Trek: The Next Generation
Ishikawa (Ghost in the Shell), a character in the Japanese seinen manga Ghost in the Shell
Sensei Sadanobu Ishikawa, a character in the video game Ghost of Tsushima, voiced by and with motion-capture by François Chau
Goemon Ishikawa XIII, a character in the Japanese manga series Lupin III
Fumiko Ishikawa, a character in popular FNF community Skyverse

References

Japanese-language surnames